Jean Nocret (December 1615/17, Nancy- November 1672, Paris) was a French painter who is best known for his portraits of the French royal family. Many portraits of uncertain origin have been attributed to him.

Biography 
He was a student of Jean LeClerc. Later, he traveled to Rome, where he met Nicolas Poussin and did some work for Poussin's patron, Paul Fréart de Chantelou. Poussin, however, thought that Nocret was a pretentious young man and complained that he left his work unfinished because he had received better offers.

Nocret returned to Paris in 1644. Five years later, he managed to obtain an appointment as painter to King Louis XIV and Gaston, Duke of Orléans. He also served as the King's valet de chambre. In 1657, he accompanied the Bishop of Comminges on a diplomatic mission to Portugal, and executed portraits of the Portuguese Royal Family. Back in Paris, in 1660, he was commissioned by the new Duke of Orléans to decorate the interiors of the Château de Saint-Cloud with scenes from Greek mythology. The Château was later destroyed, during the Franco-Prussian War. Three years later, his painting of "The Repentance of Saint Peter" earned him a place in the Académie royale de peinture et de sculpture. He became a Professor there in 1664.

Between 1666 and 1669, he decorated the Queen's apartments at the Tuileries, under the direction of Charles Le Brun. These decorations also disappeared during the Franco-Prussian War, when the Tuileries were burned. Most of them depicted scenes relating to the goddess Minerva.

His son, Jean-Charles (1648-1719), was also a portraitist, but did history painting as well. After his father's death, he was called upon to decorate the Queen's apartments at Versailles.

References

Further reading
 Édouard Meaume, Jean Nocret, peintre lorrain, Grosjean-Maupin, 1886

External links 

ArtNet: More paintings by Nocret

1615 births
1672 deaths
French painters
Portrait painters
People from Lorraine